Tommaso Lolli or Thomas Lolli (died 1667) was a Roman Catholic prelate who served as Titular Bishop of Cyrene (1650–1667).

Biography
Tommaso Lolli was a professed religious of the Order of Clerics Regular Minor.

On 19 Sep 1650, Tommaso Lolli was appointed during the papacy of Pope Innocent X as Titular Bishop of Cyrene.
On 9 Oct 1650, he was consecrated bishop by Giovanni Giacomo Panciroli, Cardinal-Priest of Santo Stefano al Monte Celio, with Luca Torreggiani, Archbishop of Ravenna, and Pedro Urbina Montoya, Archbishop of Valencia, serving as co-consecrators. 
He served as Titular Bishop of Cyrene until his death on 21 Mar 1667.

References

External links and additional sources
 (for Chronology of Bishops) 
 (for Chronology of Bishops)  

17th-century Roman Catholic titular bishops
Bishops appointed by Pope Innocent X
1667 deaths